Shiloh King Strong (born June 12, 1978) is an American actor, screenwriter, photographer, and film director whose roles include "Zelos Wilder" from Tales of Symphonia, "David Scott" from Dinotopia, and "Grant" from Buck Naked Arson.

At the age of 16, Shiloh won a Dramalogue Award for writing the play Shades of Blue. He wrote, directed and starred in the award-winning short film Irish Twins along with his brother, Rider Strong. The film premiered at the 2008 Tribeca Film Festival.

In 2008, Shiloh Strong helped create a television commercial for Barack Obama's presidential campaign called "It Could Happen To You". He appeared in the commercial with Alexandra Barreto and his brother Rider Strong. The commercial won Moveon.org's contest for funniest commercial and aired on Comedy Central.

In 2015, Shiloh started working on Girl Meets World, co-directing episodes with his brother Rider.

Filmography

As a director

Girl Meets World

 "Girl Meets the Secret of Life"  co-directed with Rider Strong – Season 2
 "Girl Meets Mr. Squirrels"  co-directed with Rider Strong – Season 2
 "Girl Meets Rules"  co-directed with Rider Strong – Season 2
 "Girl Meets Mr. Squirrels Goes to Washington"  co-directed with Rider Strong – Season 2
 "Girl Meets Yearbook"  co-directed with Rider Strong – Season 2
 "Girl Meets Creativity"  co-directed with Rider Strong – Season 2
 "Girl Meets Texas: Part 1"  co-directed with Rider Strong – Season 2
 "Girl Meets Texas: Part 2"  co-directed with Rider Strong – Season 2
 "Girl Meets STEM"  co-directed with Rider Strong – Season 2
 "Girl Meets Money"  co-directed with Rider Strong – Season 2
 "Girl Meets Jexica"  co-directed with Rider Strong – Season 3
 "Girl Meets Permanent Record"  co-directed with Rider Strong – Season 3
 "Girl Meets Ski Lodge: Part 1"  co-directed with Rider Strong – Season 3
 "Girl Meets Ski Lodge: Part 2"  co-directed with Rider Strong – Season 3
 "Girl Meets the Great Lady of New York"  co-directed with Rider Strong - Season 3

References

External links

1978 births
Living people
20th-century American male actors
21st-century American male actors
Male actors from California
American male child actors
American male film actors
Film producers from California
American male screenwriters
American male television actors
American male voice actors
Film directors from California
Male actors from the San Francisco Bay Area
Screenwriters from California